Clem is an unincorporated community in Gilliam County, Oregon, United States, at an elevation of . It was named for Clemens Augustus Danneman, who was born in Germany, came to Oregon in 1879, and owned a ranch in Gilliam County. The Clem post office was open between November 1884 and April 1937. Clem "also was a station on the Condon branch of the Union Pacific Railroad." As of November 2021, the population is seven people and one cow.

References

Unincorporated communities in Gilliam County, Oregon
Unincorporated communities in Oregon